Miss India Worldwide 2017 was the 26th edition of the Miss India Worldwide pageant, held on 8 October 2017. The event was held at Royal Albert’s Palace in New Jersey, United States.

Karina Kohli of the United States crowned her successor Madhu Valli of the US at the end of the event.

Results

Special awards

Contestants 
14 contestants competed for the title of Miss India Worldwide 2017.

 – Aarzu Singh 
 – Priya Dhunna 
 – Archana Goundar 
 – Stephanie Madavane
 – Sangeeta Bahadur  
 – Reena Merchant  
 – Shivani Shah 
 – Amardeep Talwar
 – Sanjeda Rumajogee
 – Erisha Ghogli 
 – Kashni Thakur 
 - Reema Matthew
 – Supriya Soorju 
 – Dilpreet Kaur 
 – Madhu Valli

Crossovers
Contestants who previously competed or will compete at other beauty pageants:

 – Sanjeda Rumajogee, Miss India Worldwide Mauritius, has been conferred the title of Miss Humanity Hope 2017 by Cancer Association of Mauritius (CANMA).
 – Dilpreet Kaur, Miss India UK, won the title of Andaman Beauty Pageant 2017 in Port Blair, Andaman and Nicobar Islands.

References

External links
Miss India Worldwide

2017 beauty pageants
Beauty pageants in the United States